The 74th Claxton Shield was held from 28 December 2007 to 10 February 2008. The 2008 Shield was conducted on a Home and Away series made up of 2 Divisions; Eastern Division: Australian Provincial, New South Wales Patriots and the Queensland Rams, Southern Division: Perth Heat, Victoria Aces and South Australia. Each divisional series saw each team meet 6 times with 3 home games and 3 away games, the top team from each division then meet in a 3-game Championship series.

Teams

The 2008 Claxton Shield was contested between six teams from around Australia, divided into two divisions.
2008 Claxton Shield team rosters

Southern Division
 Perth Heat
Baseball Park
 South Australia
Woodville Oval
 Victoria Aces
Melbourne Ballpark

Eastern Division
 Australia Provincial
Narrabundah Baseball Park
 New South Wales Patriots
Blacktown Baseball Stadium
 Queensland Rams
Redlands Baseball Park
Holloway Field

Match results

Southern Division

28 December 2007 at 3.30 pm, Woodville Oval

29 December 2007 at 11.00 am, Woodville Oval

29 December 2007 at 3.30 pm, Woodville Oval

3 January 2008 at 7.30 pm, Baseball Park

4 January 2008 at 7.30 pm, Baseball Park

5 January 2008 at 7.30 pm, Baseball Park

11 January 2008 at 7.00 pm, Melbourne Ballpark

12 January 2008 at 3.00 pm, Melbourne Ballpark

12 January 2008 at 7.00 pm, Melbourne Ballpark

18 January 2008 at 3.30 pm, Woodville Oval

19 January 2008 at 11.00 am, Woodville Oval

19 January 2008 at 3.30 pm, Woodville Oval

24 January 2008 at 7.30 pm, Baseball Park

25 January 2008 at 7.30 pm, Baseball Park

26 January 2008 at 7.30 pm, Baseball Park

1 February 2008 at 7.00 pm, Melbourne Ballpark

2 February 2008 at 3.00 pm, Melbourne Ballpark

2 February 2008 at 7.00 pm, Melbourne Ballpark

Eastern Division

28 December 2007 at 7.30 pm, Narrabundah

29 December 2007 at 3.30 pm, Narrabundah

29 December 2007 at 7.30 pm, Narrabundah

6 January 2008 at 9.10 am, Holloway Field

6 January 2008 at 12.00 pm, Holloway Field
No result, Game completed on 27 January on Provincial's home leg

5 January 2008 at 7.30 pm, Redlands
 Rescheduled to 25 January 2008, Narrabundah

11 January 2008 at 7.30 pm, Blacktown Olympic Ballpark

12 January 2008 at 3.30 pm, Blacktown Olympic Ballpark

12 January 2008 at 7.30 pm, Blacktown Olympic Ballpark

19 January 2008 at 7.30 pm, Redlands

20 January 2008 at 3.30 pm, Redlands

20 January 2008 at 7.30 pm, Redlands

25 January 2008 at 7.30 pm, Narrabundah

26 January 2008 at 3.30 pm, Narrabundah

26 January 2008 at 7.30 pm, Narrabundah

1 February 2008 at 7.30 pm, Blacktown Olympic Ballpark

2 February 2008 at 3.30 pm, Blacktown Olympic Ballpark

2 February 2008 at 7.30 pm, Blacktown Olympic Ballpark

Ladder

Southern Division

Eastern Division

Championship series

Game 1: 8 February 2008 at 7.30 pm, Blacktown Olympic Ballpark

Box Score

Game 2: 9 February 2008 at 7.30 pm, Blacktown Olympic Ballpark

Box Score

Awards

Top Stats

All-Star Team

External links
Official Baseball Australia Website
Official 2008 Claxton Shield Website

 
Claxton Shield
January 2008 sports events in Australia
February 2008 sports events in Australia
December 2007 sports events in Australia
Claxton Shield